John Miskella (born 7 March 1978) is an Irish former sportsperson. He played Gaelic football with the Ballincollig club and with the Cork senior inter-county team.

Playing career
Miskella made his debut for the Cork team in 1999 against Waterford.

Miskella received an All-Star in 2009 for his performances on Cork's run to the All-Ireland final.

Miskella announced his retirement in 2011 due to a groin injury.

References

1978 births
Living people
Ballincollig Gaelic footballers
Ballincollig hurlers
Cork inter-county Gaelic footballers
Dual players
Irish international rules football players
Munster inter-provincial Gaelic footballers
Winners of one All-Ireland medal (Gaelic football)